Ayers Ranch Colony is a Hutterite community and census-designated place (CDP) in Fergus County, Montana, United States. The North Fork of McDonald Creek runs through the community, part of the Musselshell River watershed leading to the Missouri River.

The community was first listed as a CDP prior to the 2020 census.

Demographics

References 

Census-designated places in Fergus County, Montana
Census-designated places in Montana
Hutterite communities in the United States